Vera Myhre née Eliasen (1920–2000) was a Danish painter and graphic artist. Her works can be seen in a number of museums and galleries, both in Denmark and abroad. She was the first woman to become president of the Royal Danish Academy of Fine Arts in 1975.

Early life and education
Born on 25 July 1920 in Copenhagen, Vera Eliasen was the daughter of the wine merchant Oskar Eliasen (1892–1969) and Eva Barham (1891–1980). She began to draw as a child and from an early age hoped to become an artist. After completing her school education on Amager, she took private drawing lessons to prepare for the Royal Danish Academy of Fine Arts, where she studied from 1941 to 1944 under Aksel Jørgensen and Vilhelm Lundstrøm. On 11 July 1943, she married the architect Gert Peter Roseler Myhre (1919–1994).

Career

She first exhibited as a painter at the Charlottenborg autumn exhibition in 1947 but became increasingly interested in the graphic arts. In collaboration with the Grafisk Kunstnersamfund (Graphic Arts Assiation), she exhibited at the Charlottenborg autumn exhibition in 1949. From 1951 to 1955, she studied graphic arts at the Royal Academy under Holger J. Jensen. Thereafter, she exhibited frequently in Denmark and abroad, including several solo exhibitions .

Myhre strove to improve conditions for Danish artists, becoming the first women to chair the Danish Painters Association (Malende Kunstneres Sammenslutning) from 1966 to 1968. From 1974 to 1990, she served on the board of the Danish Academy and in 1975, she became the first woman to serve as president of the Royal Danish Academy of Fine Arts. Thereafter she served as chair of the Academy's painters department and served on various other committees on art and culture.

As a graphic arts specialist, she taught at KADK, the Design and Conservation School, from 1981 to 1986, and at the Royal Academy's Graphic Arts School from 1986. She also wrote books and articles on the graphic arts, addressing various printing techniques including lithography, woodcarving and screen printing. Much of her own creative work was devoted to designing book covers and illustrations for magazines and pamphlets. Her graphic publications include Græsk suite (1959), her prize-winning Byen her og nu (1980) and Jernbanehjul (1984). Myhre's decorative work can be seen in Frederiksberg Town Hall and in DSB high-speed trains as well as in many museums and galleries.

Vera Myhre died on 22 June 2000 in Frederiksberg and is buried in Solbjerg Park Cemetery.

Awards
Vera Myhre was honoured with many awards including the Eckersberg Medal and the Order of the Dannebrog, both in 1981, and the Tagea Brandt Award in 1983.

References

External links
Malene Myhre's website on Vera Myhre includes a biography in Danish, photographs and examples of her work.

1920 births
2000 deaths
Danish painters
Danish graphic designers
Danish women artists
Knights of the Order of the Dannebrog
Recipients of the Eckersberg Medal
Women graphic designers